Captain Christopher Hussey (1599–1686) was an English colonial official and one of the first settlers in New England.

Career
Christopher Hussey was born in Dorking, Surrey, England in 1599 to John (1570–1632) and Mary Hussey (née Wood) (died 16 June 1660). By 1633, Hussey had settled in New Hampshire with his wife Theodate (née Bachiler), daughter of Stephen Bachiler, and his mother where he purchased land.

Hussey was one of the original founders of Nantucket, Massachusetts, becoming a landowner there by the 1660s. Hussey became a lieutenant in 1653 and a captain in 1664. In 1679, he was an Officer of the Crown having been commissioned by King Charles II of England to "govern the Royal Province of New Hampshire". He was the first person in Hampton, Rockingham County, to swear allegiance to King Charles II. He died in 1686.

Christopher Hussey's father was reportedly descended from John Hussey, 1st Baron Hussey of Sleaford, by first wife Margaret Blount. Lord Hussey was beheaded by King Henry VIII in 1537 for treason. The New England Historic Genealogical Society, however, say that his descent from noble houses "seems highly unlikely".

References 

1599 births
1686 deaths
English soldiers
People from Dorking
People from Hampton, New Hampshire
People from Nantucket, Massachusetts